Simon Greul was the defending champion but decided not to participate.Carlos Berlocq won the final against Marcel Granollers 6–4, 6–3.

Seeds

Draw

Finals

Top half

Bottom half

References
Main Draw
Qualifying Singles

Blu-express.com Tennis Cup - Singles
Internazionali di Tennis Città dell'Aquila